Celotheliaceae is a family of fungi in the monotypic order Phaeomoniellales. The family was proposed in 2008 by Robert Lücking, André Aptroot, and Harrie Sipman, while the order was circumscribed in 2015. It is sister to the clade that includes the orders Verrucariales and Chaetothyriales. Molecular clock calculations suggest that the order originated when gymnosperm diversification occurred.

The family Phaeomoniellaceae was proposed by Paul Kirk in 2015, using a reference to the description of the order Phaeomoniellales, circumscribed earlier that year. However, because Celothelium (the type genus of Celotheliaceae) is also included in the circumscription of the Phaeomoniellaceae, the older family name takes precedence and consequently, Phaeomoniellaceae is an illegitimate name according to nomenclatural rules; it is placed in synonymy with Celotheliaceae.

Genera
These are the genera that are in the Phaeomoniellaceae (including estimated number of species in each genus, totalling 27 species), according to a 2021 review of fungal classification. Following the genus name is the taxonomic authority (those who first circumscribed the genus; standardised author abbreviations are used), year of publication, and the estimated number of species. 
Aequabiliella  – 1 sp.
Celerioriella  – 3 spp.
Celothelium  – 8 spp.
Minutiella  – 1 sp.
Moristroma  – 4 spp.
Neophaeomoniella  – 3 spp.
Nothophaeomoniella  – 1 sp.
Paraphaeomoniella  – 1 sp.
Phaeomoniella   – 2 spp.
Pseudophaeomoniella  – 2 spp.
Xenocylindrosporium  – 1 sp.

Sesquiterpenes and polyketides metabolites are found in Picea rubens endophytes Phaemoniella.

References

Eurotiomycetes
Ascomycota families
Lichen families
Taxa described in 2008
Taxa named by Robert Lücking
Taxa named by André Aptroot
Taxa named by Harrie Sipman